Sciobia is a genus of crickets in the family Gryllidae and monotypic tribe Sciobiini; it was erected by Hermann Burmeister in 1838.  Species can be found in NW Africa and the Iberian peninsula.

Species 
The Orthoptera Species File includes:
subgenus Sciobia Burmeister, 1838
 Sciobia algirica (Gogorza, 1881)
 Sciobia alluaudi (Bolívar, 1925)
 Sciobia appunctata (Bolívar, 1912)
 Sciobia azruensis (Bolívar, 1925)
 Sciobia barbara (Saussure, 1877)
 Sciobia batnensis (Finot, 1893)
 Sciobia bolivari (Chopard, 1937)
 Sciobia boscai Bolívar, 1925
 Sciobia bouvieri Bolívar, 1925
 Sciobia cephalotes (Bolívar, 1925)
 Sciobia chevreuxi Bolívar, 1925
 Sciobia chopardi (Bolívar, 1925)
 Sciobia cinerea (Chopard, 1943)
 Sciobia escalerai Bolívar, 1925
 Sciobia finoti (Brunner von Wattenwyl, 1882)
 Sciobia gogorzai (Bolívar, 1912)
 Sciobia longicauda Gaillat-Airoldi, 1939
 Sciobia luctuosa (Gogorza, 1881)
 Sciobia lusitanica (Rambur, 1838) type species (as Platyblemmus lusitanicus Rambur, by subsequent designation)
 Sciobia maria Gorochov, 1985
 Sciobia mauretanicus (Saussure, 1898)
 Sciobia mazarredoi (Bolívar, 1881)
 Sciobia melillensis Bolívar, 1912
 Sciobia micropsycha (Bolívar, 1912)
 Sciobia mitrata (Saussure, 1898)
 Sciobia polita Bolívar, 1925
 Sciobia praticola (Bolívar, 1884)
 Sciobia riffensis (Morales-Agacino, 1956)
 Sciobia tatiana Gorochov, 1985
 Sciobia tristis (Bolívar, 1925)
 Sciobia umbraculata (Linnaeus, 1758)
 Sciobia uvarovi (Bolívar, 1925)
 Sciobia viettei Chopard, 1958
subgenus Thliptoblemmus Saussure, 1898
 Sciobia caliendra (Fischer, 1853)
 Sciobia foreli (Saussure, 1898)
 Sciobia hybrida (Saussure, 1898)
 Sciobia natalia Gorochov, 1985

References

External links
 

Ensifera genera
crickets
Orthoptera of Africa
Orthoptera of Europe